SoleSides Greatest Bumps is a 2000 compilation album released by Quannum Projects and Ninja Tune. The album was compiled by DJ Shadow and is a retrospective of the work of the SoleSides Crew (aka Quannum MCs), consisting of material recorded between 1992 and 1997. It was ranked at number 5 on CMJ's 2001 hip-hop chart.

Track listing

References

External links
 

2000 compilation albums
Quannum Projects compilation albums
Ninja Tune compilation albums
Hip hop compilation albums